The 2012 Winton Motor Raceway V8 Supercar event was a motor race for the Australian sedan-based V8 Supercars racing cars. It was the fourteenth event of the 2012 International V8 Supercars Championship. It was held on the weekend of 16-18 November at the Winton Motor Raceway near Benalla, Victoria.

Triple Eight Race Engineering won both races, with Jamie Whincup winning on Saturday and Craig Lowndes winning on Sunday. Whincup overcame a drive-through penalty in the second race to finish on the podium. In doing so, he secured his fourth V8 Supercar title with one round remaining, despite his closest rival Mark Winterbottom, of Ford Performance Racing, scoring the third-highest points total across the weekend.

Standings
 After 28 of 30 races.

References

External links
Official series website

Winton